Tulasidas Dasappa (16 July 1929 – 20 April 2005) was an Indian politician. He was elected to the Lok Sabha, lower house of the Parliament of India from the Mysore constituency in Karnataka in 1967,1971 and 1977 as a member of the Indian National Congress. He was Union Minister of State for Coal and Mines in the Charan Singh Ministry. He was the son of H. C. Dasappa and Yashodhara Dasappa, both former ministers and Indian independence activists.

References

External links
 Official biographical sketch in Parliament of India website

1929 births
2005 deaths
Lok Sabha members from Karnataka
India MPs 1967–1970
India MPs 1971–1977
India MPs 1977–1979
Members of the Cabinet of India
Indian National Congress politicians from Karnataka
Politicians from Mysore